GEMS Dubai American Academy (DAA) is a private international school in the Al Barsha suburb of Dubai, United Arab Emirates operated by GEMS Education. The school follows an American curriculum and offers International Baccalaureate programs.

Campus
In 2017 Dubai American Academy merged with GEMS Nations Academy and moved into its campus. The  campus includes a full provision for athletics and performing arts, with an Olympic-size swimming pool,  running track, a large gymnasium, playing fields and shaded playgrounds, theaters, and dedicated studios for music and arts for all grade levels.

Students
The total student body has 2,983 students enrolled. Over 100 nationalities are represented within the student body, with the biggest numbers coming from the US (22.07%), Canada (9.49%), India (6.84%), S. Korea (5.96%), and Egypt (4.09%). There is a 51:49 male to female ratio.

Notable alumni
 Dina Shihabi - Saudi actress working in the United States
 Johnny Boufarhat, founder of Hopin

See also

 Americans in the United Arab Emirates

References

International schools in Dubai
Buildings and structures in Dubai
International schools in the United Arab Emirates
GEMS schools
International Baccalaureate schools in the United Arab Emirates
American international schools in the United Arab Emirates
Private schools in the United Arab Emirates
Educational institutions established in 1998
1998 establishments in the United Arab Emirates